The office of the Governor of Pohnpei is the highest elected position in the state of Pohnpei, Federated States of Micronesia.

References

Pohnpei
1979 establishments in the Trust Territory of the Pacific Islands